Paolo Sebastian is an Australian fashion house, founded by designer Paul Vasileff. The atelier is located in South Australia, and the label is known for creating designs featuring intricate details and honouring the traditional methods of craftsmanship.

History 
Paul Vasileff launched Paolo Sebastian in 2007 at the age of seventeen, after studying at Adelaide technical college and at Milan's Istituto Europeo di Design. In the years since, he and his team have transformed the local label into an international couture house. Initially beginning with custom orders from acquaintances, Paolo Sebastian now works with clients, stylists and stockists across the globe.

In 2016 designer Vasileff and his team took the 2016/17 AW Gilded Wings collection to Paris, for private showings. The collection received acclaim from visiting media and the public alike.

Following the Paris showings, online luxury fashion retailer Moda Operandi hosted a trunk show of the label's 2016/17 AW couture collection.

In October 2015 the label closed the 2015 Adelaide Fashion Festival with two sold out Paolo Sebastian runway shows. Paolo Sebastian's most recent collection was launched at the 2016 Adelaide Fashion Festival, again with two sold-out shows. October 2016 saw the label once again close the Adelaide Fashion Festival, this time with international model Coco Rocha walking the runway.

In July 2017, Vasileff and his team returned to Paris to launch their Autumn Winter 16/17 Couture Collection, Reverie, during Paris Haute Couture Fashion Week.

October 2017 saw the label collaborate with Disney on an exclusive thirty-four piece couture collection entitled Once Upon A Dream. The first of its kind collaboration granted the label exclusive rights to use original Disney lyrics throughout the collection.

From October to December 2017, Vasileff had his garments on display in an exhibition at the Art Gallery of South Australia.

In July 2018 Vasileff and his team return to Paris for the third year to launch their Autumn Winter 18/19 Couture Collection, The Nutcracker.

In 2020, Paolo Sebastian debuted at Virgin Australia Melbourne Fashion Festival (VAMFF) with "The Passage of Spring" Collection.

In 2021, the brands' first ever bespoke collection launched at Melbourne Fashion Festival, inspired by Greek mythology and the goddess Persephone. "The collection follows a narrative, which starts out as pure and light in the beginning, becomes darker and returns back to the light again with flowers blossoming. However, Persephone is stronger and less naïve and vulnerable at the end of the story," said Vasileff.

Couture collections 
Paolo Sebastian releases two collections each year, often featuring hand-embroidered fabrics and beading. Vasileff designs every piece created by the label, with each collection being inspired by a distinct theme and the fashion house known for its signature expression of a story through couture.

Paolo Sebastian designs are often inspired by fable or fairy tale.

Media

Red carpet 
Paolo Sebastian gowns have been worn at The Academy Awards, the Daytime Emmy Awards, the Grammy Awards, the AACTA Awards and the TV Week Logie Awards.

Notable clients 
 Kim Kardashian
 Giuliana Rancic
 Kris Jenner
 Sonam Kapoor
 Corinne Foxx
 Megan Gale
 Delta Goodrem
 Jennifer Hawkins
 Gillian Anderson
 Carrie Bickmore
 Rachel Finch
 Dannii Minogue
 Ada Nicodemou
 Rebecca Judd
 Nadia Bartel
 Kerry Washington
 Julia Michaels  
 Mary J. Blige
 Hailee Steinfeld 
Katy Perry 
Hilary Swank 

Paolo Sebastian designs have also appeared on The Bold and the Beautiful, Days of Our Lives, Home and Away.

References

External links 
 

Clothing brands of Australia
Australian companies established in 2007